Bostwick is an unincorporated community in Geauga County, in the U.S. state of Ohio.

History
A post office called Bostwick was established in 1887, and remained in operation until 1905. A variant name was Bostwick Corners. The community was named for Shelburn Bostwick, a pioneer settler.

References

Unincorporated communities in Geauga County, Ohio
Unincorporated communities in Ohio